Cato Salsa Experience was an indie rock band from Oslo, Norway. The group formed around jam sessions at lead singer Cato Thomassen's house. The group began playing locally and released a vinyl EP before Emperor Norton Records, an American label, signed them and released their 2002 full-length, A Good Tip for a Good Time. Later in the 2000s, the group began recording albums with The Thing.

Following the beginning of Cato Thomassen's full-time musical partnership with ex Madrugada singer Sivert Höyem in 2009, the band is seemingly now defunct.



Members
Cato (Salsa) Thomassen - vocals, guitar
Christian Engfelt - bass
Jon Magne Riise - drums
Nina Bjorndalen - keyboards

Discography
Saso Calsa (Garralda Records, 2000)
A Good Tip for a Good Time (Emperor Norton, 2002)
Sounds Like a Sandwich, with The Thing and Joe McPhee (Smalltown Supersound, 2005)
Fruit Is Still Fresh (Sony Japan, 2006)
No. 3 (Rogue Australia, 2006)
Two Bands and a Legend, with The Thing and Joe McPhee (Smalltown Supersound, 2007)
Two Bands and a Legend: I See You Baby, (EP) with The Thing  and Joe McPhee (Smalltown Supersound, 2007)

References

Norwegian rock music groups